Julius von Newald (April 11, 1824 – August 17, 1897) was a 19th-century mayor of Vienna.

References 

1824 births
1897 deaths
19th-century Austrian politicians
Mayors of Vienna